Lycomorphodes aracia is a moth of the family Erebidae. It was described by E. Dukinfield Jones in 1914. It is found in São Paulo, Brazil.

References

 

Cisthenina
Moths described in 1914